Karl Wilhelm "Jake" Bohren (May 26, 1902 – March 11, 1987) was an American football player and coach.  Wilhelm played college football at the University of Pittsburgh where he was a 1923 All–American.

References

External links
 
 

1902 births
1987 deaths
American football halfbacks
Buffalo Bisons (NFL) players
Hobart Statesmen football coaches
Pittsburgh Panthers football players
Saint Vincent Bearcats football coaches
People from Jefferson County, Pennsylvania
Players of American football from Pennsylvania